Luscar is a ghost town in west-central Alberta, Canada that was once a coal mining community.

History 

Luscar lies in an area known as the Alberta Coal Branch, which has a long history of coal mining. The original underground mine at Luscar opened in 1921, and by 1922 the community consisted of about 25 or 30 homes, a small cottage hospital, a school, a general store, and other shops. The mine worked the strongly folded Jewel Seam and produced steam coal, primarily for railroad markets. Surface mining began in 1945 and underground mining had ceased by 1954. Fire destroyed the briquette plant in 1956 and later that year all mining ceased due to lack of markets for steam coal, after which the community was abandoned.

In 1970, the old Luscar townsite became the headquarters for an open-pit coal mine owned jointly by Luscar Ltd. and Consolidation Coal Company and operated by Cardinal River Coals Ltd. It produced coking coal for export to Asian steel mills. That mine closed at the end of 2000. Coal from the Cheviot Mine near Mountain Park is currently trucked to the Luscar site where it is cleaned and loaded into rail cars.

References

See also 
List of ghost towns in Alberta

Ghost towns in Alberta
Localities in Yellowhead County